Lake Pleasant is a village in Montague, Massachusetts, United States. It is also the site of an early and prominent American Spiritualist campground. It claims to be the oldest continuously-existing Spiritualist community in the United States.

Lake Pleasant was founded in 1870 as a "campmeeting grounds" with 75 tent lots, and by 1872 was popular with Spiritualists for summer tenting. In 1874 the New England Spiritualist Campmeeting Association (NESCA) was organized by Henry Buddington and Joseph Beals, and in 1879 formally incorporated. The village rapidly expanded to 90 small cottages, and  around the lake were divided into many more camping lots. At its peak, circa 1900, Lake Pleasant contained 196 homes and cottages, swelling in August to as many as 2,000 residents. Lake Pleasant was one of a couple dozen Spiritualist camp meetings in the Northeast during this time, including Onset Bay, Grove in Wareham, Massachusetts, Queen City Park in Burlington, Vermont, and Lily Dale, outside Jamestown, New York.

Emma Hardinge Britten, one of the many invited speakers at Lake Pleasant, painted this portrait of the community in 1880:

Lake Pleasant's decline began in 1907 with a fire that destroyed 130 homes, and its fate was sealed when the lake itself became a public water supply off limits to recreation. As property values fell,  many buildings were acquired by the water department for demolition. From 1913 to 1976, Lake Pleasant was home to two competing Spiritualist organizations, each with its own temple and followers, namely the original NESCA, affiliated with the National Spiritualist Association of Churches, and The National Spiritual Alliance established in 1913. The two groups differed on questions of reincarnation. The NECSA temple burned down in 1955, and NECSA itself disbanded in 1976.

Old postcards

References

 William D. Moore, "'To Hold Communion with Nature and the Spirit-World:' New England's Spiritualist Camp Meetings, 1865-1910." In Annmarie Adams and Sally MacMurray, eds. Exploring Everyday Landscapes: Perspectives in Vernacular Architecture, VII. Knoxville: University of Tennessee Press, 1997. . 
 Delta House Press
 Emma Hardinge Britten, "Spiritual Camp Meetings", Nineteenth Century Miracles; or, Spirits and Their Work in Every Country of the Earth. A Complete Historical Compendium of the Great Movement Known as "Modern Spiritualism",  New York: William Britten, 1884, pp. 542–550.

Further reading

External links
 Town of Montague, Massachusetts
 The National Spiritual Alliance

Montague, Massachusetts
Villages in Franklin County, Massachusetts
Springfield metropolitan area, Massachusetts
Spiritualist communities in the United States
Villages in Massachusetts